Francis Carver (9 June 1907 – 1986) was a British cinematographer.

Selected filmography
 The Village Squire (1935)
 Lucky Days (1935)
 Cross Currents (1935)
 Love at Sea (1936)
 House Broken (1936)
 Chick (1936)
 Talk of the Devil (1936)
 Pay Box Adventure (1936)
 Two on a Doorstep (1936)
 Ticket of Leave (1936)
 Cross My Heart (1937)
 Lancashire Luck (1937)
 The Last Curtain (1937)
 Night Ride (1937)
 Missing, Believed Married (1937)
 Mr. Smith Carries On (1937)
 The Minstrel Boy (1937)
 Millions (1937)
 Incident in Shanghai (1938)
 A Spot of Bother (1938)
 Kicking the Moon Around (1938)
 Lightning Conductor (1938)
 The Lambeth Walk (1939)
 The Silver Darlings (1947)

Bibliography
 Low, Rachael. History of the British Film: Filmmaking in 1930s Britain. George Allen & Unwin, 1985 .

External links

1907 births
1986 deaths
British cinematographers
People from Birmingham, West Midlands